Américo Vespucio Avenue is a  ring road in Santiago, Chile named after Renaissance cartographer Amerigo Vespucci. Two adjacent sections of the avenue are occupied by Vespucio Norte Express and Vespucio Sur free-flow tolling highways, which are under concession. Vespucio Avenue meets the two largest roundabouts in Santiago, namely Quilín and Grecia, which have circumferences of 793 m and 535 m respectively.

Santiago Metro 
Escuela Militar metro station is located under the junction of Vespucio and Apoquindo Avenue. The terminus stations of the Line 2, which are Vespucio Norte and La Cisterna, are located by the avenue. An underground portion of the Line 4 of the Santiago Metro runs under Américo Vespucio Avenue, which includes Príncipe de Gales, Simón Bolívar, Plaza Egaña, Los Orientales and Grecia stations. Part of the Line 4 and the complete Line 4a run along the central reservation of Vespucio Sur. In the first case, stopping at Los Presidentes, Quilín, Las Torres, Macul and Vicuña Mackenna stations, and in the second, stopping at La Cisterna, San Ramón, Santa Rosa, La Granja,
Santa Julia and Vicuña Mackenna stations.

History
A cloverleaf interchange at the intersection of Vespucio and the Route 68 was completed in 1977.

References

Bibliography
 

Roads in Chile
Ring roads